Media Play was a chain of retail stores founded in 1992 by Musicland that sold VHS, DVDs, music, electronics, toys, video games, anime, books, and board games similar to Hastings Entertainment, 2nd and Charles, and Half Price Books.  Each store contained full book, movie, music, and video game sections under one roof.  At their height, they operated 72 stores in 19 states with 2,000 employees. The first store opened in Rockford, Illinois, in 1992. Hundreds of stores were slated to be opened, but only 89 ever were. Media Play opened stores from 1992 to 2000.

Their Replay program was a loyalty program that allowed members to earn points for purchases which could earn members gift certificates.  The same Replay card also worked at Sam Goody and Suncoast Motion Picture Company stores.

In 2001, Musicland was purchased by Best Buy Co. Inc. for $696 million as part of its initiative to diversify its retail holdings to reach a larger demographic with its consumer electronics and entertainment products.  By then, Musicland numbered over 1300 stores.  Their intention was to transform Sam Goody into a destination for young people looking for hip electronics.  They launched a major remerchandising campaign and converted Musicland's On Cue concept of rural stores to the Sam Goody brand, reducing its position in books and moving more into video games and DVD.

Downfall

The store faced strong competition, particularly from websites like Amazon.com, which was founded in 1994 and provided a wider selection than the store-based Media Play.  Therefore, despite Best Buy's major efforts, they failed to generate the results they were looking for with Musicland, losing $85 million in 2002.  As a result, they put the company up for sale and were likely just weeks away from liquidating the entire chain when they found a buyer in Sun Capital Partners of Boca Raton, Florida.  Sun Capital Partners acquired the company in a cash-free transaction in exchange for acquiring Musicland's debt and leases.  Sun Capital attempted to get the company back to basics, but in December 2005 they announced the closure and liquidation of all remaining Media Play stores.

In December 2005, Minnetonka, Minnesota–based Musicland Group, which owned Media Play, announced it would close all 61 stores by the end of January 2006 and refocus on its Sam Goody and Suncoast chains.

Media Play had been unprofitable for a number of years. In late 2005, it increased its advertising and sales promotions, but that did not work. It is thought that the unprofitability, caused by competition from Wal-Mart, Best Buy, and online retailers such as Amazon.com, was the major factor in the decision to close the retail chain.

Bankruptcy
The Musicland Group filed for Chapter 11 bankruptcy in January 2006, and in February announced the closing of 226 Sam Goody and 115 Suncoast Motion Picture Company stores, and all Media Play locations. Just months after the chain closed, the website MediaPlay.com was all that remained.  In February 2006, Trans World Entertainment Corp. acquired the Musicland Group, which owned Sam Goody, Suncoast, and MediaPlay.com. Some former Media Play stores became home to f.y.e. superstores beginning in June 2006.

References

External links 
 

Companies based in Rockford, Illinois
Companies based in Minnetonka, Minnesota
Defunct retail companies of the United States
Defunct companies based in Minnesota
Companies that filed for Chapter 11 bankruptcy in 2006
Retail companies established in 1992
Retail companies disestablished in 2006